Mark Henninger is an American college athletics administrator and former football coach. He is the assistant athletic director at Marian University in Indianapolis, a position he has held since December 2022. Henninger served as the head football coach at North Carolina Wesleyan College—now known as North Carolina Wesleyan University— Rocky Mount, North Carolina from 2008 to 2012 and at Marian from 2013 to 2022. In 2014, his second season at Marian, he led the Knights to a share of the Mid-States Football Association Mideast League championship and an appearance in the NAIA Football National Championship title game, where they lost to Southern Oregon. In 2015, Henninger led the Knights to a championship game rematch with Southern Oregon, and this time Marian was the victor. For his efforts, Henninger was named the NAIA Coach of the Year by the American Football Coaches Association (AFCA) in 2014 and 2015.

Personal life
Henninger resides in Brownsburg, Indiana with his wife, Jeni, his son, Jack, and his two daughters, Mary and Abby. Henninger's son, Jack, is a quarterback on the Marian football team.

Head coaching record

References

External links
 Marian profile

Year of birth missing (living people)
Living people
Marian Knights football coaches
Millikin Big Blue football coaches
North Carolina Wesleyan Battling Bishops football coaches
Wartburg Knights football coaches
Wittenberg Tigers football coaches
Wittenberg Tigers football players
Players of American football from Indianapolis